Robert Thompson (11 February 1878 – ?) was an English footballer who played in the Football League for Blackburn Rovers.

References

1878 births
date of death unknown
English footballers
Association football goalkeepers
English Football League players
Blackburn Rovers F.C. players